NGFI-A-binding protein 2 also known as EGR-1-binding protein 2 or melanoma-associated delayed early response protein (MADER) is a protein that in humans is encoded by the NAB2 gene.

Function

This gene encodes a member of the family of NGFI-A binding (NAB) proteins, which function in the nucleus to repress or activate transcription induced by some members of the EGR (early growth response) family of transactivators. NAB proteins can homo- or hetero-multimerize with other EGR or NAB proteins through a conserved N-terminal domain, and repress transcription through two partially redundant C-terminal domains. Transcriptional repression by the encoded protein is mediated in part by interactions with the nucleosome remodeling and deactylase (NuRD) complex. Alternatively spliced transcript variants have been described, but their biological validity has not been determined.

Pathology

Recurrent somatic fusions of the two genes, NGFI-A–binding protein 2 (NAB2) and STAT6, located at chromosomal region 12q13, have been identified in solitary fibrous tumors.

References

Further reading

Human proteins